|}

The Trigo Stakes is a Listed flat horse race in Ireland open to thoroughbreds aged three years or older. It is run at Leopardstown over a distance of 1 mile and 2 furlongs (2,012 metres), and it is scheduled to take place each year in October.

The race was run for the first time in 1995.

Winners

See also
 Horse racing in Ireland
 List of Irish flat horse races

References

 Racing Post:

Flat races in Ireland
Open middle distance horse races
Leopardstown Racecourse